The family Coccinellidae ("ladybirds", "lady beetles", or "lady bugs") is divided into seven subfamilies, many tribes, and about 360 genera:

Subfamily Chilocorinae

Tribe Chilocorini
Anisorcus
Arawana
Axion
Brumoides
Brumus
Chapinaria
Chilocorus
Cladis
Curinus
Egius
Endochilus
Exochomus
Halmus
Harpasus
Orcus
Phaenochilus
Priscibrumus
Sicardiana
Simmondsius
Trichorcus
Xanthocorus
Zagreus

Tribe Platynaspidini
Boschalis
Crypticolus
Phymatosternus
Platynaspidius
Platynaspis

Tribe Telsimiini
Hypocyrema
Telsimia

Subfamily Coccidulinae

Tribe Azyini
Azya
Pseudoazya

Tribe Coccidulini
Adoxellus
Auladoria
Botynella
Bucolinus
Bucolus
Bura
Coccidula
Cranoryssus
Cryptolaemus
Empia
Erithionyx
Epipleuria
Eupalea
Eupaleoides
Geodimmockius
Hazisia
Hypoceras
Microrhizobius
Nothocolus
Nothorhyzobius
Orbipressus
Orynipus
Paracranoryssus
Psorolyma
Rhyzobius
Rodatus
Scymnodes
Stenadalia
Stenococcus
Syntona

Tribe Cranophorini
Cranophorus
Hoangus

Tribe Exoplectrini
Ambrocharis
Anisorhizobius
Aulis
Chapinula
Chnoodes
Coeliaria
Cyrtaulis
Dioria
Exoplectra
Gordonita
Incurvus
Neorhizobius
Neoryssomus
Novaulis
Oridia
Peralda
Rhizoryssomus
Sicardinus
Sidonis
Siola
Sumnius

Tribe Lithophilini
Lithophilus

Tribe Monocorynini
Mimolithophilus
Monocoryna

Tribe Oryssomini
Oryssomus
Pseudoryssomus

Tribe Poriini
Poria

Subfamily Coccinellinae

Tribe Coccinellini
Aaages
Adalia
Aiolocaria
Alloneda
Anatis
Anisolemnia
Anisosticta
Antineda
Anegleis
Aphidecta
Archegleis
Australoneda
Autotela
Bothrocalvia
Callicaria
Calvia
Cheilomenes
Chelonitis
Chloroneda
Cirocolla
Cleobora
Clynis
Coccinella
Coccinula
Coelophora
Coleomegilla
Cycloneda
Declivitata
Docimocaria
Dysis
Egleis
Eoadalia
Eoanemia
Eriopis
Erythroneda
Eumegilla
Harmonia
Heterocaria
Heteroneda
Hippodamia
Hysia
Illeis
Lemnia
Lioadalia
Macronaemia
Megalocaria
Megillina
Micraspis
Microcaria
Microneda
Mononeda
Mulsantina
Myrrha
Myzia
Naemia
Neda
Nedina
Neocalvia
Neoharmonia
Nesis
Oenopia
Oiocaria
Olla
Oxytella
Palaeoneda
Paranaemia
Phrynolemnia
Procula
Propylea
Pseudadonia
Pseudoenopia
Sospita
Sphaeroneda
Spiloneda
Synona
Synonycha
Xanthadalia

Tribe Discotomini
Discotoma
Euseladia
Pristonema
Seladia
Vodella

Tribe Halyziini
Eothea
Halyzia
Macroilleis
Metamyrrha
Neohalyzia
Oxytella
Protothea
Psyllobora
Vibidia

Tribe Singhikalini
Singhikalia

Tribe Tytthaspidini
Bulaea
Isora
Tytthaspis

Subfamily Epilachninae

Tribe Epilachnini
Adira
Afidenta
Afidentula
Afissa
Afissula
Afilachna
Chazeauiana
Chnootriba
Diekeana
Epilachna
Henosepilachna
Macrolasia
Papuaepilachna
Solanophila
Subafissa
Subcoccinella
Toxotoma
Uniparodentata

Tribe Epivertini
Epiverta

Tribe Eremochilini
Eremochilus

Tribe Madaini
Cynegetis
Damatula
Figura
Lorma
Mada
Malata
Megatela
Merma
Pseudodira
Tropha

Subfamily Ortaliinae

Tribe Noviini
Novius

Tribe Ortaliini
Amida
Amidellus
Anortalia
Azoria
Elnidortalia
Ortalia
Ortalistes
Paramida
Rhynchortalia
Scymnhova
Zenoria

Subfamily Scymninae

Tribe Aspidimerini
Acarinus
Aspidimerus
Cryptogonus
Pseudaspidimerus

Tribe Brachiacanthadini
Brachiacantha
Cyra
Hinda

Tribe Cryptognathini
Cryptognatha

Tribe Diomini
Andrzej
Decadiomus
Dichaina
Diomus
Heterodiomus
Moiradiomus

Tribe Hyperaspidini
Blaisdelliana
Corystes
Erratodiomus
Helesius
Hyperaspidius
Hyperaspis
Magnodiomus
Mimoscymnus
Planorbata
Thalassa
Tiphysa

Tribe Pentiliini
Calloeneis
Curticornis
Pentilia

Tribe Scymnini
Acoccidula
Aponephus
Apseudoscymnus
Axinoscymnus
Clitostethus
Cycloscymnus
Cyrema
Depressoscymnus
Didion
Geminosipho
Horniolus
Keiscymnus
Leptoscymnus
Midus
Nephus
Parascymnus
Parasidis
Propiptus
Sasajiscymnus
Scymniscus
Scymnobius
Scymnomorpha
Scymnus
Sidis
Veronicobius

Tribe Scymnillini
Viridigloba
Zagloba
Zilus

Tribe Selvadiini
Selvadius

Tribe Stethorini
Stethorus
Parastethorus

Subfamily Sticholotidinae

Tribe Argentipilosini
Argentipilosa

Tribe Carinodulini
Carinodula
Carinodulina
Carinodulinka

Tribe Cephaloscymnini
Aneaporia
Cephaloscymnus
Neaporia
Prodilis
Prodiloides

Tribe Limnichopharini
Limnichopharus

Tribe Microweiseini
Coccidophilus
Cryptoweisea
Dichaina
Diloponis
Gnathoweisea
Microcapillata
Microfreudea
Microweisea
Nipus
Pseudosmilia
Sarapidus
Stictospilus

Tribe Plotinini
Ballida
Buprestodera
Catanaplotina
Haemoplotina
Paraplotina
Plotina
Protoplotina
Sphaeroplotina

Tribe Serangiini
Catana
Catanella
Delphastus
Microserangium
Serangiella
Serangium

Tribe Shirozuellini
Ghanius
Medamatento
Promecopharus
Sasajiella
Shirozuella

Tribe Sticholotidini
Boschalis
Bucolellus
Chilocorellus
Coelolotis
Coelopterus
Filipinolotis
Glomerella
Habrolotis
Hemipharus
Jauravia
Lenasa
Lotis
Mimoserangium
Neaptera
Nelasa
Neojauravia
Neotina
Nesina
Nesolotis
Nexophallus
Paracoelopterus
Parajauravia
Paranelasa
Paranesolotis
Parinesa
Pharopsis
Pharoscymnus
Phlyctenolotis
Semiviride
Sticholotis
Stictobura
Sulcolotis
Synonychimorpha
Trimallena
Xamerpillus
Xanthorcus
Xestolotis

Tribe Sukunahikonini
Hikonasukuna
Orculus
Paraphellus

References

 
Coccinellidae